Gymnopilus oxylepis is a species of mushroom in the family Hymenogastraceae.

See also

List of Gymnopilus species

External links
Gymnopilus oxylepis at Index Fungorum

oxylepis
Fungi of North America
Taxa named by Miles Joseph Berkeley
Taxa named by Christopher Edmund Broome